The third eye (also called the mind's eye or inner eye) is a mystical invisible eye, usually depicted as located on the forehead, which provides perception beyond ordinary sight. In Hinduism, the third eye refers to the ajna (or brow) chakra. In both Hinduism and Buddhism, the third eye is said to be located around the middle of the forehead, slightly above the junction of the eyebrows, representing the enlightenment one achieves through meditation.

The third eye refers to the gate that leads to the inner realms and spaces of higher consciousness. In spirituality, the third eye often symbolizes a state of enlightenment. The third eye is often associated with religious visions, clairvoyance, the ability to observe chakras and auras, precognition, and out-of-body experiences. People who are said to have the capacity to use their third eyes are sometimes known as seers.

In Hinduism

In Hinduism, the third eye refers to the ajna (or brow) chakra, said to be located around the middle of the forehead, slightly above the junction of the eyebrows. Hindus place a "tilaka" between the eyebrows as a representation of the third eye, which is also seen on expressions of Shiva. He is referred to as "Tryambaka Deva", or the three-eyed lord, where his third eye symbolizes the power of knowledge, and the detection of evil. His eye is depicted by three horizontal lines in the middle of his forehead.

In Buddhism

In Buddhism, the third eye is said to be located around the middle of the forehead, slightly above the junction of the eyebrows, Buddhists regard the third eye as the "eye of consciousness", representing the vantage point from which enlightenment beyond one's physical sight is achieved, and use an urna to the same effect as Hindus.  The third eye, or the “Eye of Wisdom”, is discerned on the deity Buddha.

In Taoism
In Taoism, third eye training involves focusing attention on the point between the eyebrows with the eyes closed, and while the body is in various qigong postures. The goal of this training is to allow students to tune into the correct "vibration" of the universe and gain a solid foundation on which to reach a more advanced meditative state. Taoism teaches that the third eye, also called the mind's eye, is situated between the two physical eyes, and expands up to the middle of the forehead when opened. Taoism asserts that the third eye is one of the main energy centers of the body located at the sixth Chakra, forming a part of the main meridian, the line separating left and right hemispheres of the body.

In Theosophy
Adherents of theosophist H. P. Blavatsky have suggested that the third eye is in fact the partially dormant pineal gland, which resides between the two hemispheres of the brain. Reptiles and amphibians sense light via a third parietal eye—a structure associated with the pineal gland—which serves to regulate their circadian rhythms, and for navigation, as it can sense the polarization of light. She states that certain functions of the mind are associated with the pineal gland and the acervulus cerebri was absent in children below the age of six. C. W. Leadbeater thought that by extending an "etheric tube" from the third eye, it is possible to develop microscopic and telescopic vision. It has been asserted by Stephen Phillips that the third eye's microscopic vision is capable of observing objects as small as quarks. According to this belief, humans had in far ancient times an actual third eye in the back of the head with a physical and spiritual function. Over time, as humans evolved, this eye atrophied and sunk into what today is known as the pineal gland. Rick Strassman has hypothesized that the pineal gland, which maintains light sensitivity, is responsible for the production and release of DMT (dimethyltryptamine), an entheogen which he believes could be excreted in large quantities at the moments of birth and death.

See also

References

Citations

Works cited

Further reading

External links

 Meaning of Buddha eye - Images of Buddha Eyes
 

Buddhist philosophical concepts
Consciousness–matter dualism
Hindu philosophical concepts
Human eyes in culture
New Age
Theosophical philosophical concepts